Ruoqiang, also Charkliq, Charkhlik, Qarkilik, Chakliq, Jo-ch'ien, or Tcharghalyk
can refer to:

The town of Qakilik (or Ruoqiang, Charkhlik), in Ruoqiang (Qakilik) County, Xinjiang Uyghur Autonomous Region, China
The Ruoqiang (Qakilik) County, Xinjiang Uyghur Autonomous Region, China, named after the former town in Uyghur and after the ancient Tibeto-Burman Ruoqiang people in Mandarin.
The Charklik site, named after the town of Charkhlik (Qakilik), located in the modern Xinjiang Uyghur Autonomous Region, China
The ancient Re Qiang nation, an ancient Tibeto-Burman people and protostate located between Xinjiang, Qinghai and Tibet